Lugovoye is a rural locality (a selo) in Ivanovsky Selsoviet of Ivanovsky District, Amur Oblast, Russia. The population was 234 as of 2018. There are 2 streets.

Geography 
Lugovoye is located on the right bank of the Ivanovka River, 14 km northeast of Ivanovka (the district's administrative centre) by road. Bolsheozyorka is the nearest rural locality.

References 

Rural localities in Ivanovsky District, Amur Oblast